Christoph Victorio Egon Humberto Prinz zu Hohenlohe-Langenburg (8 November 1956 – 6 August 2006) was a European socialite and member of the extended Agnelli family.

Known as Kiko, he was born at Clinique de Mont Choisi in Lausanne, Switzerland, the elder son of Prince Alfonso of Hohenlohe-Langenburg (1924–2003) and his first wife, Princess Ira zu Fürstenberg, a niece of Giovanni Agnelli, the founder of Fiat.

He died on 6 August 2006 of massive organ failure, related to complications of diabetes and a lung infection, a few days after being imprisoned in Klong Prem Central Prison in Bangkok on charges of suspicion of illegally altering a visa. His health had been weakened from a weight-loss regimen at a Thai wellness center.

Before his death, he resided in Honolulu, Hawaii, also in Paris and Geneva, but was a citizen of Liechtenstein.

Ancestry

References

1956 births
2006 deaths
Agnelli family
House of Hohenlohe-Langenburg
Princes of Hohenlohe-Langenburg
People from Lausanne
Fürstenberg (princely family)
Prisoners and detainees of Thailand